Dennis Mathiasen (born 12 July 1981) is a Danish handballer, currently playing for Danish Handball League side Skjern Håndbold. He has played in the club for the past eight years, and was a part of the team as they won the EHF Challenge Cup in 2002 and 2003

External links
 Dennis Mathiasen

1981 births
Living people
Danish male handball players